Michael Davis (born August 1, 1961) is an American film director and screenwriter born in Rockville, Maryland.

His films include the campy horror film Monster Man and action film Shoot 'Em Up starring Clive Owen, Paul Giamatti, and Monica Bellucci.

Filmography

As executive producer

 ENTV Minute (2012, 22 episodes)
 The Lord of the Sands of Time (TBA)

As storyboard artist

 The Revenge of Al Capone (1989, TV Movie)
 Night Game (1989)
 The Cellar (1989)
 Tremors (1990)
 Teenage Mutant Ninja Turtles II: The Secret of the Ooze (1991)
 Encino Man (1992)
 Live Wire (1992)

References

External links
 

1961 births
Living people
People from Rockville, Maryland
Film directors from Maryland